The 2011 Chişinău explosion was a car explosion in the center of Chişinău, the capital of Moldova. The explosion killed the Moldovan tennis federation chief, Igor Turcan. He was heading the campaign for an independent candidate in last weekend's mayoral election.

Turcan was passing by a model Lada automobile, which had Russian number plates, when it blew up.  Turcan was sent to hospital and later died of serious injuries. The police said no one else was killed or injured in the explosion. An earlier eyewitness report had said three people were killed.

Turcan's deputy described the explosion as an "assassination" but the Prime Minister of Moldova, Vlad Filat, said it was too early to draw conclusions about what happened.

References 

Car and truck bombings in Europe
2011 in Moldova
Assassinations
Explosions in Moldova
21st century in Chișinău
June 2011 events in Europe
Murder in Moldova
2011 murders in Europe